Cazengo  is a town and municipality in Cuanza Norte Province in Angola. The municipality had a population of 171,743 in 2014.

References

Populated places in Cuanza Norte Province
Municipalities of Angola